The University of Altdorf was a university in Altdorf bei Nürnberg, a small town outside the Free Imperial City of Nuremberg. It was founded in 1578 and received university privileges in 1622 and was closed in 1809 by Maximilian I Joseph of Bavaria.

History
In the period 1614–1618,Altdorf was briefly the centre of Socinianism in Germany. Encouraged by the connections of German Antitrinitarians to the Racovian Academy in Poland, German and Polish Socinians attempted to establish in Altdorf a similar Academy. Among the notable Socinian students was the 26-year-old Samuel Przypkowski. He was admitted as student on March 22, 1614, three weeks after Thomas Seget, but was expelled from Altdorf in 1616 "Crypto-Socinianism" was widely suspected among the student body. In January 1617 the syndicus Jacob Weigel brought two students Joachim Peuschel and Johann Vogel back to Altdorf and the college made them give a public recantation. This recantation was answered by Valentin Schmalz, one the German professors of the Academy in Poland.

Notable instructors include Hugues Doneau, Scipione Gentili, and Daniel Schwenter.

Notable students include later imperial field marshals Albrecht von Wallenstein (1583–1634) and Gottfried Heinrich zu Pappenheim (1594–1632); Generalfeldwachtmeister Hans Ulrich von Schaffgotsch (1595–1635); the polymath Johann Schreck (1576–1630); the composers Wolfgang Carl Briegel (1626–1712) and Johann Pachelbel (1653–1706); and the theologian David Caspari (1648–1702).

The polymath Gottfried Wilhelm Leibniz (1646–1716), perhaps most famous for co-discovering calculus, received his Ph.D. from the University of Altdorf for his habilitation thesis in philosophy, On the Art of Combinations. However, he only submitted this thesis to Altdorf after the University of Leipzig did not guarantee him a position teaching law upon graduation.

See also 

 List of early modern universities in Europe

Notes

References
 
 Moran, Bruce T., The Universe of Philip Melanchthon: Criticism and Use of the Copernican Theory, Comitatus: A Journal of Medieval and Renaissance Studies, 4(1), 1973., pp. 1–23.

 
Altdorf
A
Altdorf
Altdorf
1809 disestablishments in Bavaria
1578 establishments in the Holy Roman Empire
16th-century establishments in Bavaria